Sir Andrew Naesmith (24 July 1888 – 23 October 1961) was a British trade union leader.

Born in Bonnyrigg in Midlothian, Naesmith grew up in Lancashire, where he worked in a cotton mill, initially as a half-timer.  He served with the Black Watch during World War I as a quartermaster-sergeant.

Naesmith joined his local weavers' union at the age of fifteen, and rose rapidly to become general secretary of the Amalgamated Weavers' Association in 1927.  He was also elected to the General Council of the Trades Union Congress (TUC), and served as the TUC's representative to the American Federation of Labour in 1935.

As a result of his position in the trade union movement, Naesmith was appointed to the Cotton Board, then in 1947 to the government's Economic Planning Board.  He resigned in 1949 due to work pressures, but instead accepted appointment as a Governor of the Bank of England.  Staff of the Bank objected to his appointment, holding that a trade union post among the governors should be held by someone from one of their own unions, but he was nonetheless reappointed in 1953, when he was also appointed to the Iron and Steel Board, and stood down from his union posts.

Naesmith was awarded the CBE in the 1942 Birthday Honours, then was knighted in the 1953 Coronation Honours.

References

1888 births
1961 deaths
Black Watch soldiers
Governors of the Bank of England
General Secretaries of the Amalgamated Weavers' Association
Members of the General Council of the Trades Union Congress
People from Midlothian
Presidents of the General Federation of Trade Unions (UK)
Knights Bachelor
20th-century English businesspeople